Littleworth is a hamlet in the parish of Wing, in Buckinghamshire, England.  It is situated between the main village and the hamlet of Burcott.

The hamlet name is of Old English origin, and means 'small enclosure'.

Today the hamlet has all but disappeared with the growth of the village of Wing, and remains as a road name only.  Littleworth is the road that leads from Wing through Burcott to Soulbury.

Hamlets in Buckinghamshire